Henry W. "Harry" Waller (2 May 1902 – 1982) was an English professional footballer who played as a outside left. He made over 200 appearances in the English Football League between spells at Torquay United and Wrexham.

References

1902 births
1982 deaths
English footballers
Association football midfielders
English Football League players
Annfield Plain F.C. players
Bury F.C. players
Torquay United F.C. players
Wrexham A.F.C. players
Telford United F.C. players